Carmentina is a genus of sedge moths.

Species
 Carmentina chrysosema
 Carmentina iridesma
 Carmentina molybdotoma
 Carmentina perculta
 Carmentina polychrysa
 Carmentina pyristacta
 Carmentina taiwanensis

References

External links
 Carmentina at Zipcodezoo.com
 Carmentina at Global Species

Glyphipterigidae